Todd Black (born February 9, 1960) is an American film producer best known for producing The Pursuit of Happyness (2006), The Taking of Pelham 123 (2009), The Equalizer (2014), Southpaw (2015), The Magnificent Seven (2016), and Fences (2016) for which he received an Academy Award for Best Picture nomination with Scott Rudin and Denzel Washington.

Filmography
He was a producer in all films unless otherwise noted.

Film

Thanks

Television

References

External links
 

1960 births
Living people
Film producers from Texas
People from Dallas
American independent film production company founders